Moon Over Ireland is the 31st studio album released by Irish singer Daniel O'Donnell in 2011. It contained original songs and newly recorded versions of well-known Irish songs.

Track listing
 "Moon Over Ireland" - 4:09
 "Maggie" - 3:28
 "The Fields of Athenry" - 4:53
 "Tipperary Girl" - 3:01
 "Cottage by the Lee" - 3:40
 "My Father's House" - 4:00
 "Sweet Sixteen" - 3:28
 "The Galway Shawl" - 4:46
 "My Lovely Donegal" - 3:42
 "My Wild Irish Rose" - 3:08
 "The Boys from Killybegs" - 3:30
 "Sonny" - 4:32
 "Moonlight in Mayo" - 3:14
 "Two Little Orphans" - 3:08
 "The Town I Loved So Well" - 7:01

Charts

See also
Dick Farrelly

References

External links
 Daniel O'Donnell's website

2011 albums
Daniel O'Donnell albums